Spartak Yerevan FC was an Armenian professional football club based in Yerevan. The club competed in the Armenian Premier League.

Club history
The club was founded in late 2000 as FC Araks-Impeks in the Armenian capital city of Yerevan. After taking over the rights of the financially struggling Araks Ararat FC to play in the Armenian Premier League, Araks-Impeks took part in the 2001 Armenian Premier League. On August 20, 2001, in the middle of the ongoing season, Araks-Impeks changed their name to Spartak Yerevan.  After the 2002 season, the club was dissolved and the players moved to FC Banants.

Record in European competitions

References

 
Spartak Yerevan
Spartak
Association football clubs established in 2000
Association football clubs disestablished in 2003
2000 establishments in Armenia
2003 disestablishments in Armenia